Calliostoma ornatum, common name the ornate topshell, is a species of sea snail, a marine gastropod mollusk in the family Calliostomatidae.

Description
The height of the shell attains 20 mm. The ornate topshell is conical shaped. It is imperforate, rather solid but not thick. It may be brown, orange-red or a brilliant violet or pale yellowish, with radiating brown flames above. The base of the shell is dotted with brown and whitish. The sculpture though variable is characteristic. The surface of whorls is encircled by spiral lirae uneven in size, and cut into very close compressed granules. There are about 10 such lirae on the penultimate whorl, but the number is variable owing to the greater or less development of interstitial riblets. The base has 10-13 concentric riblets, which have a tendency to split or become double. They are wider than the interstitial furrows. The conical spire is elevated.  The apex acute. The sutures are slightly impressed. The seven whorls are slightly convex. There are generally two or three stronger lirae near the middle or periphery, and this gives at times a slightly bicarinate outline to the body whorl. The flattened base is a little convex. The aperture is subrhomboidal and smooth inside. The arcuate columella is often bounded by a purple streak.

The foot is orange and there are distinct black eye spots at the base of paired tentacles.

Distribution
This snail is found only from the Cape Peninsula to Port Alfred along the South African coast from the low intertidal to at least 35m under water. It is endemic to this region.

References

 Kilburn, R.N. (1974) Taxonomic notes on South African marine Mollusca (3): Gastropoda: Prosobranchia, with descriptions of new taxa of Naticidae, Fasciolariidae, Magilidae, Volutomitridae and Turridae. Annals of the Natal Museum, 22, 187–220
 Kilburn, R.N. & Rippey, E. (1982) Sea Shells of Southern Africa. Macmillan South Africa, Johannesburg, xi + 249 pp. page(s): 39

External links
  Branch, G.M. et al. (2002). Two Oceans. 5th impression. David Philip, Cate Town & Johannesburg.
 

ornatum
Molluscs of the Indian Ocean
Endemic fauna of South Africa
Gastropods described in 1822
Taxa named by Jean-Baptiste Lamarck